Sarnano is a comune (municipality) in the Province of Macerata in the Italian region Marche, located about  southwest of Ancona and about  southwest of Macerata.

Sarnano borders the following municipalities: Amandola, Bolognola, Fiastra, Gualdo, Montefortino, San Ginesio.

Main sights
Among the churches in town is the church of Santa Maria Assunta and the Abbey of St Blaise in Piobbico.

People
Anelio Bocci (b. 1953), marathon runner

References

External links
 Official website

Cities and towns in the Marche